Bleach Green (also known as Bleach Green Halt) is a former station operated by Northern Ireland Railways in the village of Whiteabbey, County Antrim, Northern Ireland.

The station sat near the viaducts at the junction of the Belfast-Larne railway line and Belfast-Derry railway line, but only had platforms on the Larne Line tracks. It closed to passengers in 1977 when NIR services were cut back. Today, owing to later development work and track relaying, little trace of the station remains aside from space in the trackside vegetation where the platforms once were.

References

Disused railway stations in County Antrim
Railway stations opened in 1925
Railway stations closed in 1977
Railway stations in Northern Ireland opened in the 20th century